The American Alliance of Museums (AAM), formerly the American Association of Museums, is a non-profit association whose goal is to bring museums together. Founded in 1906, the organization advocates for museums and provides "museum professionals with the resources, knowledge, inspiration, and connections they need to move the field forward." 

AAM represents the scope of museums, professionals, and nonpaid staff who work for and with museums. AAM represents more than 25,000 individual museum professionals and volunteers, 4,000 institutions, and 150 corporate members. Individual members include directors, curators, registrars, educators, exhibit designers, public relations officers, development officers, security managers, trustees, and volunteers.

Museums represented by the more than 4,000 institutional members include art, history, science, military, maritime, and youth museums, as well as public aquariums, zoos, botanical gardens, arboretums, historic sites, and science and technology centers.

At the 2014 American Alliance of Museums conference, the Institute of Museum and Library Services announced there are now at least 35,000 museums in the US.

History
An informal meeting was held at the National Museum in Washington, D.C., on December 21, 1905, for the "purpose of discussing the advisability of endeavoring to establish an association of the museums of America." Major events in the history of the Alliance include:

 1906: Founding
 1911: Directory of North and South American museums published
 1923: Headquarters established in Washington, D.C. (offices in the tower of the Smithsonian Castle)
 1925: Code of Ethics for Museum Workers adopted
 1925: $2,500 grant from the Carnegie Corporation for research on museum fatigue
 1961: Museum directory published (4,600 institutions)
 1964: Museums included in the National Arts and Cultural Development Act
 1966: National Museum Act passed
 1968: Belmont Report recommends developing an accreditation program to help support museums
 1969: Accreditation program created on the recommendation of a committee chaired by Holman J. Swinney
 1971: The Public Museum of Grand Rapids and fifteen additional museums are the first accredited
 1976: New constitution adopted
 1980: Museum Assessment Program (MAP) created on the recommendation of a committee chaired by E. Alvin Gearhardt, with MAP supported through a cooperative agreement with IMS, the Institute of Museum Services (later renamed IMLS, the Institute of Museum and Library Services)
 2003: Launch of the Nazi-Era Provenance Internet Portal (NEPIP)
 2006: Year of the Museum – 100th anniversary of AAM
 2009: First Comprehensive Strategic Plan "The Spark" adopted
 2012: Name changed to "American Alliance of Museums"

Media & Technology Committee
Media & Technology (M&T) is a Professional Network of the American Alliance of Museums (AAM), a museums organization in the United States. The M&T Network is the AAM link between museums and media technologies. It identifies, examines, and advocates appropriate uses of media technologies in helping museums meet the needs of their public. Membership is limited to institutions or individuals that are members of AAM.

Presidents/Chairpersons

 Hermon Carey Bumpus (1906–07), director of the American Museum of Natural History
 William M.R. French (1907–08), director of the Art Institute of Chicago
 William Jacob Holland (1908–09), director of the Carnegie Museums of Pittsburgh
 Frederic A. Lucas (1909–1910), director of the American Museum of Natural History
 Frederick J.V. Skiff (1910–11), director of the Field Museum of Natural History
 Edward S. Morse (1911–12), director of the Peabody Museum of Archaeology and Ethnology
 Henry L. Ward (1912–13), director of the Milwaukee Public Museum
 Benjamin Ives Gilman (1913–14), secretary of the Museum of Fine Arts, Boston
 Oliver C. Farrington (1914–16), curator, Field Museum of Natural History
 Henry R. Howland (1916–18), director of the Buffalo Society of Natural Sciences
 Newton H. Carpenter (1918–19), executive secretary of the Art Institute of Chicago
 Paul M. Rea (1919–21), director of the Charleston Museum
 Frederic Allen Whiting (1921–23), director of the Cleveland Museum of Art
 Chauncey J. Hamlin (1923–29), president of the Buffalo Society of Natural Science and a founder of ICOM
 Fiske Kimball (1929–32), director of the Philadelphia Museum of Art
 Paul J. Sachs (1932–36), associate director of the Fogg Art Museum, Harvard University
 Herbert E. Winlock (1936–38), director of the Metropolitan Museum of Art
 Clark Wissler (1938–45), curator of the Department of Anthropology, Yale University
 David E. Finley (1945–49), director of the National Gallery of Art and chairman of the National Trust for Historic Preservation
 George H. Edgell (1949–51), director of the Museum of Fine Arts, Boston
 Albert E. Parr (1951–53), director of the American Museum of Natural History
 William M. Milliken (1953–57), director of the Cleveland Museum of Art
 Edward P. Alexander (1957–60), vice president for interpretation at Colonial Williamsburg Foundation
 Froelich G. Rainey (1960–63), director of the Museum of Archaeology and Anthropology at the University of Pennsylvania
 Charles Van Ravenswaay (1963–66), director of the Missouri Historical Society
 Charles Parkhurst (1966–68), director of the Baltimore Museum of Art
 William C. Steere (1968–70), president, the New York Botanical Garden
 James M. Brown III (1970–72), director of the Virginia Museum of Fine Arts
 Charles E. Buckley (1972–74), director of the Saint Louis Art Museum
 Joseph M. Chamberlain (1974–75), director and president of Adler Planetarium
 Joseph Veach Noble 1975–78, director of the Museum of the City of New York
 M. Kenneth Starr (1978–1980), director of Milwaukee Public Museum
 Craig Call Black, director of Carnegie Museum of Natural History
 Dan Monroe, director of Portland Art Museum
 Robert MacDonald (1985–1988), director of the Museum of the City of New York
 W. Richard West (1998–2000), director of the National Museum of the American Indian
 Louis Casagrande (2002–2004), director of the Boston Children's Museum
 Jeffrey Rudolph (2004–2006), director of the California Science Center
 Irene Hirano (2006–2008), director of the Japanese American National Museum
 Carl R. Nold (2008–2010), president and chief executive officer of Historic New England
 Douglas G. Myers (2010–2012), executive director of San Diego Zoo Global
 Meme Omogbai (2012–2014), chief operating officer of the Newark Museum
 Kaywin Feldman (2014–2016), director and president of the Minneapolis Institute of Art
 Douglas Jones (2016–2018), director of the Florida Museum of Natural History
 Kippen de Alba Chu (2018–2020), executive director of Iolani Palace
 Chevy Humphrey (2020–2022), president and CEO of the Museum of Science and Industry, Chicago

Directors/Presidents
 Charles R. Richards (1923–27), director of Cooper Union
 Laurence Vail Coleman (1927–58)
 Joseph Allen Patterson (1958–67)
 Kyran M. McGrath (1968–75)
 Richard McLanathan (1975–78)
 Lawrence L. Reger (1978–1986)
 Edward H. Able (1986–2006)
 Ford Watson Bell (2007–2015)
 Laura L. Lott (2015– )

See also

 Art Museum Partnership 
 Association of Art Museum Directors
 National Education Association
 New England Museum Association

References

External links 
 

 
Organizations established in 1906
Museum associations and consortia
Professional associations based in the United States
Museums in the United States
Non-profit organizations based in Washington, D.C.
1906 establishments in the United States